Software Development Times, better known as SD Times, is a magazine published by D2 Emerge, in both a print version and an on-line electronic edition.

History and profile
It has been published since 2000. The first issue appeared in February 2000. The headquarters is in Melville, New York. Since 2003, it has published an annual award list, the "SD Times 100", which honors the top 100 leaders and innovators in the software development industry, as judged by SD Times''' editors.

Starting in January 2011, SD Times'' switched from a bi-monthly to monthly circulation. In July 2017, BZ Media sold SD Times to D2 Emerge, co-founded by then publisher David Lyman and long-time editor-in-chief David Rubenstein.

Christina Cardoza was named SD Times' news editor in December 2017 by D2Emerge.

References

External links 
SD Times web site

Bimonthly magazines published in the United States
Computer magazines published in the United States
Monthly magazines published in the United States
Online magazines published in the United States
Magazines established in 2000
Magazines published in New York (state)
2000 establishments in New York (state)
Software development